Soluble quinoprotein glucose dehydrogenase (soluble glucose dehydrogenase, sGDH, glucose dehydrogenase (PQQ-dependent)) is an enzyme with systematic name D-glucose:acceptor oxidoreductase. This enzyme catalyses the following chemical reaction

 D-glucose + acceptor  D-glucono-1,5-lactone + reduced acceptor

This soluble periplasmic enzyme contains PQQ as prosthetic group, and is bound to a calcium ion. Electron acceptor is not known.

References

External links 
 

EC 1.1.99